Zaika is an Indian restaurant in Kensington, London.

From 2001 to 2004 it was awarded a Michelin star, making it along with the Tamarind in London the first Indian restaurants to be awarded stars. In 2012 it was taken over and joined the same group that also owned the Tamarind restaurant. Shortly after, Zaika was launched as an Italian restaurant but this was not successful and in 2013, reopened once again as an Indian restaurant.

See also

 English cuisine
 list of Indian restaurants

References

External links 
 Official Website
 The Guardian Review from 2001
 New York Times reviews 2007

Indian restaurants in London
Michelin Guide starred restaurants in the United Kingdom